Eulepidotis mustela is a moth of the family Erebidae first described by Herbert Druce in 1889. It is found in the Neotropics, including Mexico.

References

Moths described in 1889
mustela